The Buck Baker Racing School was founded by two time NASCAR Sprint Cup Series champion Buck Baker in 1980. Buck Baker Racing School was the first of its kind. Today, Buck Baker's Seat Time Racing School, still follows the curriculum set by Buck Baker to teach racers, race fans, and adrenaline junkies professional racing skills. 
There is no lead-follow format and passing is allowed on the straight aways.  At the least, participants learn how to run the preferred racing line around the track, how to merge onto a race track, and how to exit and enter pit road.  The Advanced racing course involves running the  low, high, and preferred lines side by side with an instructor's car and nose to tail. 

Vehicles used in the school are actual NASCAR Sprint Cup, Xfinity, or Camping World Ford, Chevy and Dodge race cars and trucks which have previously competed in their respective series. Paired with the 3.18 and 3.25 ratio rear ends and 6000rpm rev limiters this gives a top speed of around 160 mph at Atlanta and Charlotte. At Rockingham the cars top out around 140mph, and at Bristol 115mph. 

 Atlanta Motor Speedway (Hampton, GA)
 Bristol Motor Speedway (Bristol, TN)
 Rockingham Speedway (Rockingham, NC)
 Charlotte Motor Speedway (Concord, NC)

School is now "Buck Baker's Seat Time Racing School"
  www.seattimeracingschool.com

Notable Graduates Of Buck Baker Racing School

NASCAR Drivers

 Bobby Allison
 Dave Blaney
 Mike Bliss
 Todd Bodine
 Jeff Burton
 Ward Burton
 Stacy Compton
 Ricky Craven
 Brendan Gaughan
 Jeff Gordon
 David Green
 Jeff Green
 Bobby Hillin Jr.
 Buckshot Jones
 Jason Keller
 Joe Nemechek
 Ryan Newman
 Steve Park
 Jeff Purvis
 Shawna Robinson
 Hermie Sadler
 Tim Steele
 Tony Stewart
 Randy Tolsma

Other NASCAR Personalities

 Jeff Hammond
 Mike Joy

Other Automobile Racers

 Derek Bell
 Kenny Bräck
 Buzz Calkins
 John Force
 Hurley Haywood
 Lyn St. James
 Danny Sullivan
 Larry "The King" Costa
 Richard Lanson
Other

 Jerry Glanville
 Hank Parker
 Jeff Probst
 Jonnie Stewart
 Ken Stabler
 Travis Tritt
 Robert Porter

External links
 -Seat Time Racing School -formerly the Buck Baker Racing School

References

Racing schools
Educational institutions established in 1980
1980 establishments in the United States